The Dampier Saltworks Important Bird Area is a 52 km2 saltern lying close to the town of Dampier, an industrial port in the Pilbara region of north-west Western Australia.  The salt processing facility is operated by Dampier Salt Ltd, part of the Rio Tinto Group.

Birds
The solar evaporation ponds at Dampier have been identified by BirdLife International as an Important Bird Area (IBA).  They regularly support over 1% of the world populations of the red-capped plover and red-necked stint and similarly support the Oriental plover and sharp-tailed sandpiper occasionally.  The saltworks is also home to small numbers of the range-restricted dusky gerygone.

See also
 Port Hedland Saltworks Important Bird Area

External links
 Dampier Salt

References

Pilbara
Saltworks
Important Bird Areas of Western Australia